The JDC World Darts Championship is a darts youth's tournament that has been held since 2017 in various locations, while the final match is played during the PDC World Darts Championship in Alexandra Palace, London. Competitors participating in the JDC World Darts Championship must be under 18 years of age on the day of the final. Rusty-Jake Rodriguez became the first JDC World Champion.

Final results and statistics

References

JDC World Darts Championship
Darts tournaments
Recurring sporting events established in 2017